Shir Maghz-e Pain (also Romanized as Shīr Maghz-e Pā’īn) is a village in Nimbeluk Rural District, Nimbeluk District, Qaen County, South Khorasan Province, Iran. At the 2006 census, its population was 13, in 4 families.

References 

Populated places in Qaen County